is a Japanese light novel series by Tomohiro Matsu, with illustrations by Peco. Twelve volumes have been published by Shueisha under their Super Dash Bunko imprint. "Mayoi Neko" translates as "Stray Cats", referring the name of the cafe around which the story develops, and alluding to the orphans and other "stray" characters who collect there. It is also the name of a school club for helping people in the story.

A manga adaptation by Kentaro Yabuki was serialized in Shueisha’s Jump Square magazine from January 4 to October 4, 2010. In this adaptation, many characters from Yabuki's previous manga, To Love Ru, make cameo appearances. An anime television series adaptation animated by AIC aired in Japan from April 6 to June 29, 2010.

Plot
The story revolves around Takumi Tsuzuki, who spends his days with his childhood friend Fumino Serizawa at the cafe Stray Cats, and with his friends, in the Umenomori Academy. One day, his older stepsister Otome brings home a strange girl named Nozomi Kiriya to live with them. When his other friend Chise Umenomori starts a Stray Cats Club that helps people, Takumi's life is filled with new activities.

Characters

Main

 (adult); Minako Kotobuki (child)
The protagonist of the story, he is the adopted younger brother of Otome Tsuzuki. He was found as a baby, abandoned on a tatami mat, and was named Takumi by the orphanage. He used to live in the same orphanage as Fumino, until it closed down. He ran away from the orphanage and was found by Otome, and they subsequently became family. He is usually in charge of the Stray Cats patisserie, as Otome is often absent from the shop. He is childhood friends with Fumino, and is the only person who knows what Fumino's words usually mean. He's a relatively nice person but is very oblivious to the other girls' feelings for him, especially Fumino's.

One of the main heroines of the story, she is the childhood friend of Takumi, and has been with him ever since they were both in the orphanage. She is beautiful but has a habit of meaning entirely the opposite of what she usually says, a fact only Takumi seems to be aware of. It was revealed that Takumi was the unwitting inspiration for this habit. She works at the Stray Cats as a part-time job just so she could be with Takumi even after he was adopted by Otome.

When she's angry, she tends to shout "Die twice!" (or occasionally, "Die ten thousand times!") to the poor soul who incurred her wrath. In addition, Takumi (and occasionally Ieyasu) is the unfortunate recipient of much of her violent outbursts, ironically it being him who taught her that. She also beats up Takumi when the two of them end up in close proximity with each other by accident, out of embarrassment. As such, her behavior resembles a typical tsundere.

She has a crush on Takumi, and is frequently teased about it by her good friend, Kanae. She developed feelings for Takumi because he used to protect her from being bullied from when they were still at the orphanage together, and his kind nature. However, she dislikes his obliviousness towards her feelings, and once questioned to herself what did the other girls like about him. She confesses to Takumi in a panic, and leaves Takumi somewhat hanging on the credibility of what she had said, stating both love and hate towards him. Fumino's parents died in an accident, leaving her orphaned. She is also shown to be extremely jealous when Takumi gets along well with other girls, and if they try to get Takumi to go along with their plans, she will come up with a lie on the spot to prevent them from monopolizing him.

She is easily embarrassed, and can get worked up if someone even suggests that she cares for them. To hide this, she normally comes up with unrealistic lies to hide her concern for anyone (or her feelings for Takumi). She also has a strong, decisive character which normally tends to show up in tense situations. She has few friends due to her brash, abrasive character, and at the beginning of the story, her only friends were Takumi and Kanae, although gradually, she makes more friends with the likes of Nozomi and Chise becoming an important part of her life.

The heiress of the Umenomori family and one of the main heroines. Though her family is wealthy, she is isolated by its prominence and her parents' absence. Her parents are normally busy at work and almost never around (it has been over a year since she last saw them), so she lives through every single day without feeling the warmth of a family. Thus, Chise is spiritually and emotionally orphaned, yet another "stray cat" in need of a home. She is a typical spoiled rich girl who uses her great wealth and authority to get whatever she wants, and is the chief instigator of the sports festival competition between the spats and bloomers factions in volume 2.

She has the appearance of a beautiful elementary school girl, but is actually a high-schooler the same age as Fumino and Takumi. She looks upon Takumi as her servant and has a strange desire for him to let her hold his hand (the reason for this was apparently due to how Takumi had helped her up when they first met) as well as (along with Nozomi) to pat on her head. She has a clash of personalities with Fumino, and the two girls end up bickering whenever they are within the vicinity of each other, usually requiring Takumi to intervene and put an end to the disagreement. However, as the story progressed, their endless bickering gradually became a sign of closer friendship.

She harbours a crush on Takumi because he was the first person to act totally oblivious to her status as the heir to the Umenomori family and to treat her normally. This, coupled with her loneliness, caused her to have a secret desire to join Takumi's circle of friends although she feels that a reason is required so as not to appear too abrupt.

To get around this problem, she decides to create a club and forcefully ropes in Takumi and his friends as members. When Takumi mentioned his after school job, she offers to buy every cake at the Stray Cats, hoping that Takumi and his friends can attend the club and keep her company. Takumi later refuses to sell her any cakes, telling her that it is meaningless to sell cakes like that and persuades her to try her hand at making a cake so as to understand why. Chise ends up making a passable attempt at baking a cake and subsequently decides to start working at the Stray Cats while Takumi and his friends also join her club. Later the club was named , whose primary purpose is to help others in need. Compared to Fumino and Nozomi, Chise is much more open with her feelings for Takumi and would go through far greater lengths just to be with Takumi, much to the ire of Fumino.

She is often seen with her two maids and an elderly butler who deeply care for her.

A beautiful and mysterious girl Otome picked up at the train station on the way home. Also one of the main heroines. She arrived at the Stray Cats, not revealing anything about herself but her name. She normally tends to be indifferent and emotionless, but also seems to be a little airheaded.

She has a tendency to say "Nya~", much like a cat, complete with mimicry. Her hairstyle also oddly resembles a pair of cat ears. She transfers to Umenomori Gakuen, with some intervention from Chise, and ends up in the same class as Fumino and Takumi. She is good in studies, sports and the piano, and when she was learning how to make a cake from Otome, she did it perfectly on her first try, and was appointed the new patisserie of Stray Cats. Nozomi, according to Takumi, also scored the highest in a practice exam at school. Additionally, in the anime, she is shown to be able to fix a television as well, despite the fact that she probably has not fixed one before, as well as singlehandedly winning a sports competition.

In the anime, she was something more of an unseen character for the first episode, often just parts of her were shown on screen and was referred to as a large cat to people who got a glimpse of her. However, she wasn't fully seen till the end, when Otome showed her to them.

Supporting

The owner of the Stray Cats store, and the person who adopted Takumi. She has a tendency to be away from the shop frequently because she likes to help people the best she can, even if she has to go to the ends of the world to do it. This usually leaves the store with nothing to sell at times. She is able to accomplish many of her good acts thanks to the efforts of Chise. Otome's personality is described as reckless, by Takumi and Fumino. She is surprisingly clumsy at making cakes, and is not very good at it, despite being the owner of Stray Cats. The reason her business stays afloat is because many of the guys like to see her, due to her beauty. She is also known to be a celebrity around town, mainly for her heroic exploits.

Later, it was revealed that Otome herself was an orphan adopted by the Tsuzuki family, and her desire to help others were mostly an influence from her foster parents, who died in an accident when Takumi was in junior high. While Otome behaves frequently like an air-headed child, she is unusually perceptive about the people she meets, and can easily see through others if they are experiencing trouble of some sorts. A running joke involving her is the fact that since she has a large bust, there are not a lot of swimsuits that can fit thus the top tends to break. She often hugs Takumi into them as well, giving him plenty of sisterly affection which makes the other girls (who are jealous of her bust) annoyed. Moreover, she is apt to spoil him, further provoking more jealousy from the other girls.

Fumino's closest friend, other than Takumi. She is also the class representative, and frequently teases Fumino about Takumi, being aware of her crush towards him. She seems to display a perverted behavior when it comes to skinship, especially towards Fumino. Her nickname for Takumi is "Takumicchi".

A long-time acquaintance of Chise, as her family has had close relations with the Umenomori family for generations. She is two years older than Chise and the other members of Stray Cats Associates Club. She seems to be a prim and proper lady, and unlike Chise, uses  in 100% of her dialog. She is exceptionally intelligent and is apparently skilled in manipulation. Like Fumino, she cannot be honest about her words and actions, while at the same time, unlike Fumino, she has no friends who can understand her well. She is also one of the ladies outside of the heroines to be romantically interested in Takumi. Kaho has qualified nurse training and later went to pursue medicine in Germany after graduating from Umenomori Gakuen, which she transferred to during her last semester in her final year. She is also the first girl to kiss Takumi, even sacrificing her first kiss just to invoke amusing reactions from the girls who are after him.

In the anime, she apparently finds a passed out Takumi in the mountains, and saves him from getting soaked outside in the rain. She pretends to be lost in the mountains, when in fact, she is very familiar with the area (it later turns out that the area belongs to her family), for reasons unknown.

She gets an extended role in the manga adaptation, where she happens to be the one who alerts Shimako Murasame about the whereabouts of Nozomi. The bond between the Stray Cats camaraderie proves to be unbreakable as she admits her defeat (indicating this was one of her schemes). She later transfers to Umenomori Gakuen following that incident and expresses her wish to join the Stray Cats Associates Club.

One of Takumi's best male friends, and a galge maniac. He frequently provokes Fumino with his comments and is most of the time protected by Takumi from her outbursts. He also has a tendency to compare situations in galge to those in real life. He calls Otome 'Master', because she once saved him from a group of delinquents, and has been the only girl in the 3-D world whose existence he fully acknowledges. He is normally seen with or conspiring with Chise on her plans due to both of their liking of anime and manga and the fact that Chise often offers him something of value due to her wealth.

One of Takumi's best male friends who is very old fashioned. He apparently holds Otome in the highest regard, and addresses her with the suffix '-dono', because he greatly admires her helping spirit. He is engaged to Tamao Fujino after her confession on Valentine's Day.

Maids of Chise. They can erase their presence completely and appear without fail whenever Chise calls for them. Satou is actually classmates with Takumi and company, while Suzuki is actually a second-year student at Umenomori Gakuen.

A long hair beauty and student of Umenomori Gakuen who is two years senior to Takumi and friends. She is on very good terms with Kanae, and is also part of the Spats (which refers to a type of athletic tights in Japan) faction led by Fumino in volume 2 of the series. After her love confession to Daigorō on Valentine's Day in her final semester, she became engaged to him. Subsequently, she calls Daigorō Dai-chan, and acts lovey-dovey over him, often joining the Stray Cats Associates Club meeting in their clubroom and feeding Daigorō food.

Twin-tailed girl who is one year junior to Takumi and friends. A new student to Umenomori Gakuen and a Fujoshi, she joined Stray Cats Associates Club after scoring a break-through high in an extremely high-level examination on otaku knowledge set by Ieyasu. During junior high, she missed attending school often as the other students often made fun of her. By the end of volume 7, she was the fifth girl to fall for Takumi in the series.

Media

Anime

Theme music

Opening theme
 by Kanae Itō, Yuka Iguchi and Ayana Taketatsu
 Yoshiki Fukuyama (episode 7)
Ending theme
 by Kanae Itō, Yuka Iguchi and Ayana Taketatsu
 by Kanae Itō, Yuka Iguchi and Ayana Taketatsu (episode 6)
 by Hitomi Mieno (episode 7)
 by Umenomori Gakuen Bloomer Ha no Minna-san (episode 11)
Insert songs
 by Umenomori Gakuen Bloomer Ha no Minna-san (episode 11)
 by Umenomori Gakuen Spats Ha no Minna-san (episode 11)

References

External links
Light novel official website 
Manga official website 
Anime official website 

2008 Japanese novels
2010 anime television series debuts
2010 manga
Anime and manga based on light novels
Anime International Company
Light novels
Novels about orphans
Romantic comedy anime and manga
Shōnen manga
Shueisha franchises
Shueisha manga
Sunrise (company)
Super Dash Bunko